Malacothrix may refer to:
Malacothrix (mammal), a genus of rodents
Malacothrix (plant), a genus of plants